The 29th District of the Iowa Senate is located in eastern Iowa, and is currently composed of Dubuque, Jackson, and Jones Counties.

Current elected officials
Carrie Koelker is the senator currently representing the 29th District.

The area of the 29th District contains two Iowa House of Representatives districts:
The 57th District (represented by Shannon Lundgren)
The 58th District (represented by Steve Bradley)

The district is also located in Iowa's 1st congressional district, which is represented by Ashley Hinson.

Past senators
The district has previously been represented by:

Jack Rife, 1983–1992
William Dieleman, 1993–1994
Dennis Black, 1995–2002
Nancy Boettger, 2003–2012
Tod Bowman, 2013–2018
Carrie Koelker, 2019–present

See also
Iowa General Assembly
Iowa Senate

References

29